Manuel Ferrando (1868 - December 12, 1934) was a missionary bishop who served in Puerto Rico.  He was ordained as a Catholic priest in his native Spain, where he became superior of a Capuchin monastery.  From there he was sent to Latin America as a missionary.  In 1902, he broke with Rome and started his own mission called the "Church of Jesus" in Puerto Rico.

Ferrando was consecrated as a suffragan bishop in The Episcopal Church in 1923.

References 

1868 births
1934 deaths
Episcopal bishops of Puerto Rico